Ishtiaq Ahmed (born 19 January 1977) is a former Bangladeshi first-class cricketer who played for Barisal Division. He is currently an umpire.

References

External links
 

1977 births
Living people
Bangladeshi cricketers
Barisal Division cricketers
Place of birth missing (living people)